Costinel Ionuț Gugu  (born 20 May 1992 in Craiova) is a Romanian footballer who plays for Gloria Bistrița-Năsăud. In his career, Gugu also played for teams such as FC U Craiova 1948, CS Mioveni, ASA Târgu Mureș, Le Havre or Universitatea Cluj, among others.

International career
Gugu played with the Romania U-19 at the 2011 UEFA European Under-19 Football Championship, which took place in Romania. He made his debut for under-19 team in the same tournament on 20 July 2011 in a game against Czech Republic U-19.

Honours
FC U Craiova 1948
Liga II: 2020–21
Liga III: 2019–20

References

External links 
 
 

1992 births
Living people
Sportspeople from Craiova
Romanian footballers
Romania youth international footballers
Romania under-21 international footballers
Romanian expatriate footballers
Association football defenders
Liga I players
FC U Craiova 1948 players
CS Turnu Severin players
ASA 2013 Târgu Mureș players
Ligue 2 players
Le Havre AC players
Liga II players
CS Mioveni players
FC Argeș Pitești players
FC Universitatea Cluj players
CSA Steaua București footballers
Liga III players
CS Gloria Bistrița-Năsăud footballers
Expatriate footballers in France
Romanian expatriate sportspeople in France